Baba Adam Shahid was a 15th-century Muslim figure in Bengal. Adam's name is associated with a holy war against an unjust ruler of Vikramapura by the name of Raja Vallalasena Baidya.

Biography
Baba Adam was living in Makkah as a faqir. One day, a Muslim villager from Kanachang (in Vikramapura) came to him and informed him about the oppression of Vallalasena, a Baidya who ruled the kingdom of Vikramapura. The villager had sacrificed a cow to celebrated his son's aqiqah and for this he was oppressed by Hindu King Vallalasena who viewed cows as sacred. For this, he fled the country and went to Makkah. Hearing this story, Adam went to Vikramapura with 7,000 followers. Vallalasena decided to take action against the Muslims. Adam briefly left the battlefield and retreated to a nearby cave so that he could perform the Asr prayer. The Raja found him and killed him with his sword, thus Adam was martyred; earning him the title of Shahid. Later, Vallalasena and his family lost their lives by throwing themselves into a pit of fire.

Legacy
Adam was buried in a tomb; now situated in the courtyard of a mosque constructed by Jalaluddin Fateh Shah's officer Malik Kafur in 888 AH (1483-1484 AD). The mosque is known as Baba Adam's Mosque and is a protected monument visited by many tourists.

Known in Hindu literature as "Bayadumba the Mleccha", Adam's story is mentioned in the Vallalacharita. This book was written by a 16th-century Shaivist commentator by the name of Ananda Bhatta at the request of Sri Buddhimanta Khan, the Raja of Nabadwip.

References

Bengali Sufi saints
Munshiganj District
Indian people of Arab descent
People from Mecca
15th-century Indian Muslims